La Peña is a corregimiento in Santiago District, Veraguas Province, Panama with a population of 3,990 as of 2010. Its population as of 1990 was 7,005; its population as of 2000 was 3,746.

References

Corregimientos of Veraguas Province